William Reed (June 6, 1776 – February 18, 1837) was a U.S. Representative from Massachusetts.

Born in Marblehead in the Province of Massachusetts Bay, Reed received a limited education. He worked as a merchant.

Reed was elected as a Federalist to the Twelfth and Thirteenth Congresses (March 4, 1811 – March 3, 1815). He served as a member of the board of the Andover Theological Seminary. He was a Trustee of Dartmouth College, Hanover, New Hampshire.

He resumed work as a merchant. He died in Marblehead, Massachusetts, February 18, 1837, and bequest of funds to Dartmouth allowed the erection of Reed Hall, the school's first building attributable to a single donor. He was buried in a private burial ground on Harris Street in Marblehead.

References

1776 births
1837 deaths
People from Marblehead, Massachusetts
Federalist Party members of the United States House of Representatives from Massachusetts